Negrișoara may refer to the following rivers in Romania:

 Negrișoara, a tributary of the Dâmbovnic in Argeș County
 Negrișoara (Dorna), a tributary of the Dorna in Suceava County
 Negrișoara (Neagra Broștenilor), a tributary of the Neagra Broștenilor in Suceava County
 Negrișoara (Plapcea), a tributary of the Plapcea in Olt County
 Negrișoara, a tributary of the Sebiș in Arad County

See also 
 Negrea River (disambiguation)
 Neagra River (disambiguation)
 Negrinho River (disambiguation)